Aliko Bala (born 27 February 1997) is a Nigerian professional footballer who plays as a winger.

Club career

FK AS Trenčín
He came to AS Trenčín in summer 2015 together with his compatriot John Chia. He made his professional debut for AS against Ružomberok on 23 August 2015 as a substitute in the 67th minute of the match.

Honours
Zulte Waregem
 Belgian Cup: 2017

References

External links
 AS Trenčín official club profile
 Futbalnet profile
 

1997 births
Living people
Nigerian footballers
Association football forwards
AS Trenčín players
S.V. Zulte Waregem players
Hapoel Acre F.C. players
Hapoel Marmorek F.C. players
Aswan SC players
Slovak Super Liga players
Belgian Pro League players
Israeli Premier League players
Egyptian Premier League players
Expatriate footballers in Slovakia
Expatriate footballers in Belgium
Expatriate footballers in Israel
Expatriate footballers in Egypt
Nigerian expatriate sportspeople in Slovakia
Nigerian expatriate sportspeople in Belgium
Nigerian expatriate sportspeople in Israel
Nigerian expatriate sportspeople in Egypt
Sportspeople from Jos